Murilo Endres (born May 3, 1981) is a Brazilian volleyball player, member of Brazil men's national volleyball team and Brazilian club SESI São Paulo. He is a double silver medalist of the Olympic Games from Beijing 2008 and London 2012, World Champion (2006, 2010), silver medalist of the World Championship 2014, multimedalist of the World League, South American Championship, World Cup and the Grand Champions Cup.

Career

Club
Endres in 2006 up to 2009 season play in Italian League Modena Club. He played as wing spiker for Sesi São Paulo for the 2010/2011 season, in Brazil.

National team
With the Brazil national team he won seven World Leagues (2003, 2004, 2005, 2006, 2007, 2009, 2010), one World Cup (2007) and two World Championships (2006, 2010). He was named the MVP of 2010 World Championship and 2010 World League. He competed at the 2008 Summer Olympics and at the 2012 Summer Olympics, winning the silver medal both times. Murilo won the silver medal and the "Best Receiver" award at the 2011 FIVB World League. Murilo Endres star player national team in season 2012. He was also named the MVP of the 2012 Summer Olympics tournament. Murilo went through a shoulder surgery in 2013 and was out of the national team for the hole season. In 2014, the wing spiker got back to the national team and helped the team to achieve the silver medal in the FIVB World League. Murilo Endres in 2010 year he was given Prêmio Brasil Olímpico as the best Brazilian athlete of the year.
Murilo went through a shoulder surgery in 2013 and was out of the national team for the whole season. In 2014, the wing spiker got back to the national team and helped the team to achieve the silver medal in the FIVB World League and in the FIVB World Championship. After recovery from surgery, Murilo was part of the team that played the World League in 2015.

Personal life
He was born in Passo Fundo, Rio Grande do Sul, Brazil. He has an older brother Gustavo, who is also volleyball player.

On October 22, 2009 he married Jaqueline Carvalho, who is also a Brazilian volleyball player. In mid-July 2013 Murilo and his wife Jaqueline announced that they were expecting a baby. On December 20, their first child was born, a boy named Paulo Arthur Carvalho Endres.

Sporting achievements

Clubs

Challenge Cup
  2007/2008 - with Trenkwalder Modena

National championships
 2010/2011  Brazilian Championship, with SESI São Paulo

National team
 2001  FIVB U21 World Championship
 2004  FIVB World League
 2005  FIVB World League
 2005  South American Championship
 2005  FIVB World Grand Champions Cup
 2006  FIVB World League
 2006  FIVB World Championship
 2007  FIVB World League
 2007  South American Championship
 2007  FIVB World Cup
 2008  Olympic Games
 2009  FIVB World League
 2009  South American Championship
 2009  FIVB World Grand Champions Cup
 2010  FIVB World League
 2010  FIVB World Championship
 2011  FIVB World League
 2011  South American Championship
 2011  FIVB World Cup
 2012  Olympic Games
 2014  FIVB World League
 2014  FIVB World Championship

Individually
 2009 South American Championship - Most Valuable Player
 2010 Memorial of Hubert Jerzy Wagner - Most Valuable Player
 2010 FIVB World League - Most Valuable Player
 2010 FIVB World Championship - Most Valuable Player
 2010 Prêmio Brasil Olímpico – Best athlete of the Year
 2011 Brazilian Championship - Best Receiver
 2011 Brazilian Championship - Most Valuable Player
 2011 FIVB World League - Best Receiver
 2012 Olympic Games London - Most Valuable Player
 2013 Brazilian Championship - Best Receiver
 2014 FIVB World Championship - Best Outside Spiker

References

External links

 FIVB Profile

1981 births
Living people
People from Passo Fundo
Brazilian men's volleyball players
Volleyball players at the 2008 Summer Olympics
Volleyball players at the 2012 Summer Olympics
Olympic volleyball players of Brazil
Olympic silver medalists for Brazil
Volleyball players at the 2007 Pan American Games
Olympic medalists in volleyball
Medalists at the 2012 Summer Olympics
Medalists at the 2008 Summer Olympics
Pan American Games gold medalists for Brazil
Pan American Games medalists in volleyball
Medalists at the 2007 Pan American Games
Liberos
Outside hitters
Sportspeople from Rio Grande do Sul